Henri Marie Edmond Valéry Giscard d'Estaing (born 17 October 1956) is a French businessman and son of former French President Valéry Giscard d'Estaing.

Biography
Giscard d'Estaing studied at the Paris Institute of Political Studies and has a masters in economics.

He began his career with Cofremca where he served as associate director from 1982 to 1987, helping research changes in patterns of food consumption and its impacts on marketing and strategy.

In 1987 he joined the Danone Group and held various executive positions with subsidiaries such as HP Foods and Evian-Badoit.

Giscard d’Estaing joined the resort company Club Med in 1997 as chief operating officer in charge of finance, development and international relations. He became chief executive officer in 2001 and chairman in 2002. Since 2004, he has rebranded the company as upscale, but with an all-inclusive price, closing the least profitable resorts to reinvest capital back into the most profitable.

After the takeover of Club Med by Fosun International, he was named president of Club Med SAS.

Personal life 
He is married to jonkvrouw Wilhelmine Jeanne Mathilde Elisabeth Sickinghe (born 1956) on June 30, 1984 in Naarden, Netherlands. The couple have three children: one son, Frédéric and two daughters, Sophie and May.

Ancestry

References

1956 births
Living people
French businesspeople
Sciences Po alumni
Paris 2 Panthéon-Assas University alumni
Saint-Jean de Passy alumni
Children of national leaders of France
French untitled nobility
People from Paris